Coreius is a genus of cyprinid fish belonging to the subfamily Gobioninae. They are known as gudgeons. This genus is endemic to freshwater habitats in China. It currently contains four recognized species.

Species
 Coreius cetopsis (Kner, 1867)
 Coreius guichenoti (Sauvage & Dabry de Thiersant, 1874)
 Coreius heterodon (Bleeker, 1864)
 Coreius septentrionalis (Nichols, 1925)

References

 

 
Fish of Asia
Freshwater fish of China
Taxa named by David Starr Jordan